Henry Mace (4 June 1837 – 19 July 1902) was a New Zealand cricketer. He played in one first-class match for Wellington in 1877/78.

See also
 List of Wellington representative cricketers

References

External links
 

1837 births
1902 deaths
New Zealand cricketers
Wellington cricketers
People from Bedale